Amadou "Doudou" N'Diaye (born 17 January 1951) is a Senegalese athlete. He competed in the men's long jump at the 1980 Summer Olympics.

References

External links
 

1951 births
Living people
Athletes (track and field) at the 1980 Summer Olympics
Senegalese male long jumpers
Olympic athletes of Senegal
Place of birth missing (living people)